The 2010–11 Big 12 Conference men's basketball season marks the 15th season of Big 12 Conference basketball.

This will be the final season for the Big 12 as a 12-team conference, as two schools will leave at the end of the 2010–11 academic year. Colorado will join the Pacific-10 Conference, which will become the Pac-12, while Nebraska will join the Big Ten Conference.

Preseason

Big 12 Coaches Poll

All-Big 12 players

Jacob Pullen, Kansas State (unanimous)
LaceDarius Dunn, Baylor (unanimous)
Cory Higgins, Colorado
Marcus Morris, Kansas
Curtis Kelly, Kansas State

Player of the Year 
Marcus Morris, Kansas

Newcomer of the Year
Ricardo Ratliffe, Missouri

Freshman of the Year
Josh Selby, Kansas

Regular season

Rankings

In-season honors
Players of the week
Throughout the conference regular season, the Big 12 offices name a player of the week each Monday.
Nov. 15 – Jordan Hamilton, Texas
Nov. 22 – Jordan Hamilton, Texas
Nov. 29 – Marcus Morris, Kansas
Dec. 6 – Marcus Denmon, Missouri
Dec. 13 – Marshall Moses, Oklahoma State
Dec. 20 – Khris Middleton, Texas A&M
Dec. 27 – Markieff Morris, Kansas
Jan. 3 – Marcus Denmon, Missouri
Jan. 10 – Alec Burks, Colorado
Jan. 17 – Marcus Morris, Kansas
Jan. 24 – Jordan Hamilton, Texas
Jan. 31 – Mike Singletary, Texas Tech 
Feb. 7 – Jacob Pullen, Kansas State
Feb. 14 – Marcus Morris, Kansas
Feb. 21 – Jacob Pullen, Kansas State
Feb. 28 – Alec Burks, Colorado

See also
2010–11 NCAA Division I men's basketball season
2011 Big 12 men's basketball tournament

References